Norwell may refer to:

Norwell, Massachusetts, United States
Norwell, Nottinghamshire, England
Norwell, Queensland, Australia
Norwell District Secondary School in Palmerston, Ontario, Canada